Lawrence Charles Eastman  (3 June 1897 – 17 April 1941) was an English cricketer. He played for Essex County Cricket Club between 1920 and 1939.

An all-rounder, Eastman first played for Essex as an amateur and was appointed assistant secretary of the club, before becoming a professional in 1927. He was originally a medium-pace bowler, but developed leg-spin later in his career. He coached in New Zealand in 1927–28 and 1928–29, when he played for Otago; he also coached in South Africa.

Eastman fought in the First World War and was awarded the Distinguished Conduct Medal and Military Medal. He died in the Second World War of an illness contracted after a high-explosive bomb exploded close to him whilst he was serving as an air raid warden.

References

External links

1897 births
1941 deaths
English cricketers
English cricket coaches
Essex cricketers
Cricketers from Greater London
British Army personnel of World War I
British civilians killed in World War II
Otago cricketers
English cricketers of 1919 to 1945
Sir T. E. W. Brinckman's XI cricketers
Recipients of the Distinguished Conduct Medal
Recipients of the Military Medal
London Regiment soldiers
Military personnel from Middlesex
Civil Defence Service personnel